Dmytro Yakovenko may refer to:

 Dmytro Yakovenko (athlete) (born 1992), Ukrainian high jumper
 Dmytro Yakovenko (footballer) (born 1971), Ukrainian football player